Sorbus graeca, also known as the Greek whitebeam and  fan-leaved service-tree is a species of whitebeam, member of the genus Sorbus in the rose family (Rosaceae).

Description

Distribution and habitat 
The tree is native to most of Europe (Albania, Austria, the Baleares, Bosnia-Herzegovina, Bulgaria, Croatia,  Czech Republic, France, Germany, Greece, Hungary, Italy, Malta, Poland, Romania, Sicily, Slovakia, Slovenia, Serbia, Turkey, Ukraine), the Caucasus (Armenia, Azerbaijan, Georgia), the Eastern Mediterranean (Cyprus, Lebanon, Syria) and parts of North Africa (Algeria, Morocco).

References 

graeca